Chel may refer to:

 NHL (video game series), often colloquially known as Chel
 Chel, a village in the municipality of Chajul, Guatemala